La Petite Rivière is a tributary of the Gulf of Saint Lawrence, flowing in the eastern part of the municipality of L'Île-d'Anticosti, in the Minganie Regional County Municipality, in the administrative region of Côte-Nord, in province of Quebec, in Canada.

The main forest road (east–west direction) of Anticosti Island indirectly serves the upper part of this valley. A secondary forest road serves the west bank of this small valley.

Forestry is the main economic activity in this area.

Geography 
La Petite Rivière draws its source from a very small lake surrounded by marshes and located in the eastern part of Anticosti Island. The mouth of this small lake is located at:
  east of the town center of the village of Port-Menier;
  east of the eastern tip of Anticosti Island;
  south of the northeastern shore of the island;
  north of the southeast shore of Anticosti Island.

From its source, the Petite Rivière generally flows south-east between the Cormorant River (located on the west side); and Baie du Naufrage (located on the east coast of Anticosti Island).

  first to the south-east in a marsh area to a bend in the river; then east, collecting the discharge (coming from the northwest) of a marsh area and another discharge (coming from the north) of the marsh at the end of the segment, to the discharge (coming from the north) d 'a set of small lakes and marshes;
  towards the south-east, forming small coils in places, collecting a stream (coming from the north-east) and crossing a marsh area at the end of the segment, until the discharge (coming from the northwest) of a small lake and marsh areas;
  towards the south-east crossing a marsh area, to its mouth.

La Petite Rivière empties into the western part of Cybèle Bay, on the south shore of Anticosti Island.

The left bank of the lower course of the river serves as the limit for the Pointe-Heath ecological reserve

Toponymy 
Anticosti Island has two toponyms "La Petite Rivière"; one in the eastern part and the other in the western part.

The toponym "La Petite Rivière" was made official on September 12, 1974, at the place name bank of the Commission de toponymie du Québec.

See also 
 Minganie Regional County Municipality
 L'Île-d'Anticosti, a municipality
 Anticosti Island, an island
 Gulf of Saint Lawrence
 List of rivers of Quebec

References 

Rivers of Côte-Nord
Anticosti Island
Minganie Regional County Municipality